The Territory of Minnesota was an organized incorporated territory of the United States that existed from March 3, 1849, until May 11, 1858, when the eastern portion of the territory was admitted to the Union as the State of Minnesota and western portion to the unorganized territory then the land shortly became the  Dakota territory.

History

The Minnesota Territory was formed on March 3, 1849, with present day states of Minnesota and a large portion of modern-day North and South Dakota.  At the time of formation there were 5000 settlers living in the Territory.  There were no roads from  adjoining Wisconsin or Iowa.  The easiest access to the region was via waterway of which the Mississippi River was primary. 
The primary mode of transport was the  riverboat. Minnesota Territory had three significant pioneer settlements: St. Paul, St. Anthony/Minneapolis, and Stillwater plus two military reservations: Fort Snelling and Fort Ripley.  All of these were located on a waterway.   A reservation for the Winnebago had been created at Long Prairie in 1848.  The Chippewa Agency, at Crow wing, was founded in 1852.  The Upper and Lower Sioux Agencies were created in 1853.  All of these were located adjacent a waterway also.  The primary territorial institutions were in the three main settlements, St. Paul was made the capital; Minneapolis was selected as the site of the University of Minnesota; and Stillwater was chosen for the Territorial Prison.  The Military Reservations were Federal land of which the Fort Snelling Unorganized Territory still exists.  Fort Ripley is now the Minnesota National Guard's Camp Ripley.  The first school in the Territory was located at Fort Snelling as was the first Post Office.   The first  justice of the peace was at Mendota as was the first Church in Minnesota.    St. Peter's Catholic Church at Mendota was built in 1840.

Governor Ramsey requested that Congress approve funds for five military roads in the Territory: Mendota/Fort Snelling to the Big Sioux  confluence with the Missouri River, Point Douglas to Fort Ripley, Fort Ripley Road/Swan River to Long Prairie Indian Agency, Point Douglas to Superior.  Money was approved in 1850 for four with the Point Douglas Fort Ripley Military Road being the first.  Money was approved later for a survey of the route to the Big Sioux/Missouri, the Fort Ridgely and South Pass Wagon Road and the Wagon Road from Fort Ripley to Fort Abercrombie.  Private trails were being cut too.  The most well known of these was Dodd Road from 1853.  It was named after Capt. Dodd, and significant portions of it still exist. 

When the region was Wisconsin Territory the Red River Trails were further developed by Joe Rolette.  There were three main trails now identified as the : West Plains Trail, East Plains Trail, and the Woods Trails.  They connected Fort Gerry and the Selkirk Settlement with Fort Snelling and the American Fur Trading Company at Mendota. Later, the Oxcarts  became synonymous with St. Paul's Kellogg St. and the riverboat landing.    Fort Ripley lay along the East Plains Trail.

In 1850, 10 years after the end of the Second Great Awakening (1790–1840), of the three churches with regular services in the Minnesota Territory, one was Catholic, one was Methodist, and one was Presbyterian. In the 1850 United States census, 9 counties in the Minnesota Territory reported the following population counts:

Territorial Governors

Territorial Secretaries
Charles K. Smith, 1849–1851
Alexander Wilkin, 1851–1853
Joseph Rosser, 1853–1857
Charles L. Chase, 1857–1858

Territorial Attorneys General
Lorenzo A. Babcock, 1849–1853
Lafayette Emmett, 1853–1858

Congressional Delegates
Henry Hastings Sibley, 31st Congress, 32nd Congress, 1849–1853
Henry Mower Rice, 33rd Congress, 34th Congress, 1853–1857
William W. Kingsbury, 35th Congress, 1857–1858

See also

John Catlin
Historic regions of the United States
History of Minnesota
Interior Plains
Territorial evolution of the United States
Territory of Dakota, 1861–1889

References

External links

Minnesota historic documents (incl. Organic Act, Enabling Act, Act of Admission and territorial maps)
Debates and proceedings of the Constitutional convention for the territory of Minnesota, to form a state constitution preparatory to its admission into the Union as a state

 
1849 establishments in Minnesota Territory
1858 disestablishments in the United States
Former organized territories of the United States